State Route 73 (SR 73) is west-north state highway in East Tennessee. For most of its length, it is an unsigned companion route to U.S. Route 321 (US 321).

Route description
SR 73 begins at an interchange with Interstate 40 (I-40) concurrent with U.S. Route 321 (US 321) and SR 95 south of Oak Ridge and north of Lenoir City. The three highways head south to an intersection with US 70 and I-75 in Lenoir City. They then continue southeast to intersect US 11 in Lenoir City. SR 95 leaves US 321 and SR 73 south of Lenoir City, The two highways head east into Blount County traveling just south of Friendsville. On the edge of Maryville the highways have a short concurrency with SR 335 and intersect US 129, in downtown they intersect US 411 and SR 33. The highways then proceed out of Maryville and intersect Foothills Parkway's western segment in Chilhowee, turn south and then back east to Townsend where the highways intersect SR 73 Scenic. US 321 and mainline SR 73 turn north and SR 73 Scenic heads east into the Great Smoky Mountains National Park. They then absorb and begin a concurrency with SR 32 in Cosby and intersect Foothills Parkway's eastern segment. SR 73 then leaves US 321 and SR 32 south of Newport. It then has a second interchange with I-40 and heads northerly to terminate at US 25 and US 70 on the east side of Newport.

Between Lenoir City and the second intersection with SR 32 in Cosby, SR 73 is an unsigned primary highway designated east–west. For the rest of its length, it is a signed secondary highway designated north–south.

Junction list

Scenic route

State Route 73 Scenic (SR 73 Scenic) is a spur route of SR 73 in Blount and Sevier counties in the eastern portion of Tennessee. It serves as a connector route into the Great Smoky Mountains National Park. The road runs from Townsend to southwest of Gatlinburg. The route is also called Fighting Creek Gap Road from US 441 to the Elkmont Campground entrance and Little River Gorge Road to the Towsend Entrance Road. The Great Smoky Mountains National Park, as well as many locals, often refer to this stretch of park road as "Little River Road" as this road follows the former roadbed of the Little River Railroad along the Little River from the Townsend entrance to the Park to Elkmont.

It begins at US 321 and mainline SR 73 in Townsend and heads east into the Great Smoky Mountains National Park and ends its signed portion at Laurel Creek Road which goes to Cades Cove. The unsigned portion begins and continues through the park to end at US 441 in the park south of Gatlinburg, It then becomes signed again and turns north on to US 441/SR 71 and follows US 441/SR 71 for 2.7 miles to US 321/SR 73 in downtown Gatlinburg where it ends.

TDOT has this route internally designated as State Route 337 (SR 337).

SR 73 Scenic was formerly a portion of SR 73, which was moved to US 321 when that route was extended to the area in 1981.

Despite being signed Secondary on TDOT maps, in Gatlinburg, State Route 73 Scenic is signed Primary with the concurrency of U.S. 441/ SR 71 throughout the Great Smoky Mountains National Park. It is also signed as Primary along East Parkway (US 321).

Junctions

See also

References

073
Transportation in Sevier County, Tennessee
Maryville, Tennessee
Townsend, Tennessee